Bali is an animated television series, based on a series of French children's books by Magdalena Richard and Laurent Richard that were published by Editions Flammarion. It was produced by Paris-based PlanetNemo Animation and Subsequence Entertainment, in association with SRC Radio-Canada, TVOntario, Knowledge Network, France 5, Disney Channel France and RTBF, and with the participation of the Shaw Rocket Fund, the Quebec Film and Television Tax Credit, Telefilm Canada, the Canadian Film or Video Production Tax Credit, and the Canadian Television Fund (or the Fonds canadien de television in French). PlanetNemo Animation has licensed the television program to more than 20 countries worldwide and has sold U.S. media and merchandising rights.

The show first premiered in Canada on SRC Radio-Canada in 2006. It was also shown on PBS Kids in the USA in 2010 until 2013. Currently, it is airing on independent TV stations KUEN-TV, WNYE-TV, Semillitas, a Spanish-speaking U.S. television network, and PBS affiliate Arkansas PBS. Episodes are available to stream on Amazon Prime Video, through the PBS Kids subscription service.

Premise
The show follows the adventures of Bali, a modern preschool puppy; his parents; his younger sister Lea; and Kikou, his stuffed animal in a city apartment in New York City.

Characters

 Bali
 Elliot 
 Mary
 Lea
 Madame Olga
 Maman
 Nanou
 Tito
 Tamara
 Sacha
 Charlie
 Suan
 Saba
 Mateo

Segments
Each episode consists of two segments:

 Brrr! It's Cold!/Lollipops Everywhere!
 
 I Need A Haircut/Nanou To The Rescue
 I'm Not Scared/I Need To Keep Going
 I'm the Cook/Go Team, Go!
 I Want To Be Tall!/We Need to Stay Awake
 Vroom, Vroom!/My Little Fish
 Searching for Treasure/My Papili's Garden
A Present for Nana/I'm So Hot!
 I Don't Want to Give it Back/Robo-Bear to the Rescue!
 I'm Sleeping at Tamara's/I Don't Want New Shoes
 A Surprise Adventure/Roll Camera, Action!
 It's Wrong to Cheat/Too Many Stories
 I'm Not Sharing!/You're Mean
 My New Friend Mateo/Come on, Dad, Let's Go, Let's Go!
 Splish, Splash, I'm Swimming!/Don't Cry, Tamara!
 I'm So Upset/Oh No! I'm Lost
 Look at That, and That, and That!/When I Grow Up
Welcome, Saba!/It Was an Accident!
What a Mess!/But We're Not Tired
 Boo!/Quiet, Dad and Lea are Sick!
 I Don't Like Parents Arguing/"Ow, It Hurts!
 Nana and Papi are Lost!/I Want to Race
 Old Toys Are Fun!/Yum Yum, It's Dinner Time!
It's A Fun Party!/I'm Not Having Fun
 I'm Making New Friends/Wow! It's Not So Easy!
 Nooo, I Want To See The Movie!/Yahoo! It's Christmas!

Awards
Bali received the top prize in the animation category at the 2005 MIPCOM Jr. It had won awards at the Prix Gémeaux Awards and Argentina's Cordoba Intl. Animation Festival - ANIMA.

In other media

Books
The book series the television series is based on was written by Magdalena Richard and Laurent Richard, and was published by Editions Flammarion:

 Bali fait du vélo
 Bali et Kikou, au bain!
 Bali va à l'école
 Bali dit non
 Bali et ses petits trésors
 Mon livre jeu Bali-Bali en vacances
 Bali attend Noël
 Bali a la varicelle
 Bali va chez Nanou
 Bali va à la mer
 Soun dort chez Bali
 Bali a un nouveau lit N. éd.
 Bali pique-nique à la maison N. éd.
 Bali prend son bain
 Bali a un nouveau lit
 Bali a une baby-sitter
 Bali joue à cache-cache
 Les plus belles histoires de Bali
 Bali a la varicelle

Stage show
Bali has had a stage show run in Paris called "Pakita Chante Bali".

References

External links

 

2000s Canadian animated television series
2005 Canadian television series debuts
2006 Canadian television series endings
2000s French animated television series
2005 French television series debuts
2006 French television series endings
2005 Belgian television series debuts
2006 Belgian television series endings
Canadian children's animated adventure television series
French children's animated adventure television series
TVO original programming
Animated television series about children
Animated television series about dogs
English-language television shows